The 64th Infantry Division (64-ya Pekhotnaya Diviziya) was an infantry formation of the Russian Imperial Army.

Organization
1st Brigade
253rd Infantry Regiment
254th Infantry Regiment
2nd Brigade
255th Infantry Regiment
256th Infantry Regiment

References

Infantry divisions of the Russian Empire